Bahadurganj is a town nestled in the Tarai of Himalaya and a notified area in Kishanganj district  in the state of Bihar, India.

Geography
It has an average elevation of 51 metres (167 feet).

Demographics

2001 Census 
 India census, Bahadurganj had a population of 28,224. Males constitute 53% of the population and females 47%. Bahadurganj has an average literacy rate of 34%, lower than the national average of 59.5%; with 69% of the males and 31% of females literate. 21% of the population is under 6 years of age.

2011 Census 
As per 2011 census report Bahadurganj has a total population of 36,993 of which 51.02% are males while 48.98% are females. In Bahadurganj Nagar Panchayat, Female Sex Ratio is of 960 against state average of 918.Moreover Child Sex Ratio in Bahadurganj is around 1010 compared to Bihar state average of 935. Literacy rate of Bahadurganj city is 61.90 % higher than state average of 61.80 %. In Bahadurganj, Male literacy is around 68.42 % while female literacy rate is 55.02 %. Population of Children with age of 0-6 is 7019 which is 18.97 % of total population of Bahadurganj (NP).

References

Cities and towns in Kishanganj district